Surazh (or Suraž) is an urban-type settlement in Vitebsk Region of Belarus, approximately 45km northeast from the city of Vitebsk. It is situated at the crossing of the Daugava (or Western Dvina) and Kasplya rivers.

Jewish Community 

Suraž was a shtetl, with a Jewish population of 1,246 in 1900. 

In 1917, there were 6 synagogues. All of them were wooden, except one made out of stone. There were 461 Jews in Suraž in 1939 (15.4 % of the total population).

The village was under German occupation from 1941 to 1943. Einsatzkommando 9 carried out the murder of the Jews of Surazh in conjunction with an antipartisan operation. On August 12, 1941, between 600 and 750 Jews were gathered by the Germans on the location of the former printing office in Sourazh. Then, they were taken and shot behind the linen factory, 2 km away from the village, in pits of the ravine, known as Loubtchyno. The bodies of the victims were exhumed and reburied after the war in the Jewish cemetery.

References

External links

Populated places in Vitebsk Region
Vitebsky Uyezd